Wildwood and Wild Wood may refer to:

Populated places

Australia
Wildwood, Victoria, a suburb of Melbourne

Canada
Wildwood, Alberta, a hamlet
Wildwood, Calgary, Alberta, a neighborhood
Wildwood, Saskatoon, Saskatchewan
Wildwood Park, Winnipeg, Manitoba

United States

Wildwood, California
Lake Wildwood, California
Wildwood, Florida
Wildwood, Georgia
Wildwood, Illinois
Wildwood, Chicago, Illinois
Wildwood, Indiana
Wildwood, Kentucky
Wildwood, Michigan, an unincorporated community
Wildwood, Charlevoix County, Michigan, an unincorporated community
Wildwood, Minnesota
Wildwood, Missouri
Wildwood, New Hampshire, a former village
Wildwood, New Jersey
Wildwood, Oregon, in Clackamas County
Wildwood, Oregon, in Lane County
Wildwood, Pennsylvania
Wildwood, Roanoke, Virginia
Wildwood, Washington
Wildwood, Wisconsin

Parks and recreation areas
Wildwood Regional Park, a park in Thousand Oaks, California, United States
Wildwood Discovery Park, a wildlife park in Kent, England
Wildwood Park for the Arts, an arts venue and gardens in Little Rock, Arkansas, United States
Wildwood Preserve Metropark, Toledo, Ohio, United States
Wildwood Recreation Site, Wildwood, Clackamas County, Oregon
Wildwood State Park, Long Island, New York, United States

Buildings in the United States

Wildwood Correctional Complex, a prison complex near Kenai, Alaska
Wildwood (Hot Springs, Arkansas), listed on the NRHP in Arkansas
Wildwood School, a school in Los Angeles, California
Wildwood Farm, Skylight, Kentucky, listed on the NRHP in Kentucky
Wildwood Plantation House, Jackson, Louisiana, listed on the NRHP in Louisiana
Wildwood Cottage, Harrisville, New Hampshire
Wildwood (Semora, North Carolina), a historic home
Wildwood House (Ferguson, Missouri), a style house
Wildwood Hall, Newbury, Vermont, listed on the NRHP in Vermont
Wildwood Park Elementary, a school in Puyallup, Washington
Wildwood (Beckley, West Virginia), a historic home
Wild Wood High School (disambiguation), multiple schools

Types of landscape
British wildwood, an ancient natural landscape of post-ice age Britain

Music
"The Church in the Wildwood", a song by William S. Pitts
Wild Wood, a solo record by Paul Weller
"Wildwood Flower", a traditional American folk song often associated with the Carter Family

Books
Wildwood: The Wildwood Chronicles, Book 1, a children's fantasy novel by Colin Meloy

Ships
Wildwood (PC-1181), a US Navy submarine chaser during World War II

Businesses
Wildwood Banjos, a small company based in the U.S. state of California
Wildwood Enterprises, Inc, a film and television production company co-founded by Robert Redford
Wildwood Kitchen, a British casual dining chain

See also
Wildewood, Maryland